The 2005–06 Maryland Terrapins women's basketball team represented the University of Maryland, College Park in the 2005–2006 NCAA Division I basketball season. The Terps were coached by Brenda Frese. The Terps are a member of the Atlantic Coast Conference and won the NCAA championship.

Regular season

Roster

Season schedule

Player stats

Postseason

NCAA basketball tournament
Albuquerque Regional
Maryland (2) 95, Sacred Heart (15) 54
Maryland 81, St. John’s (7) 74
Maryland 82, Baylor (3) 63
Maryland 75, Utah (5) 65
Final Four
Maryland 81, North Carolina 70
Maryland 78, Duke 75

Awards and honors
Laura Harper, Tournament Most Outstanding Player

Team players drafted into the WNBA
Marissa Coleman was selected second overall in the 2009 WNBA draft.
Shay Doron was selected in the second round (16th overall) of the 2007 WNBA draft.
Laura Harper was selected in the first round (10th overall) of the 2008 WNBA draft.
Crystal Langhorne was selected in the first round (sixth overall) of the 2008 WNBA draft.
Kristi Toliver was selected third overall in the 2009 WNBA draft.

See also
List of Atlantic Coast Conference women's basketball regular season champions
List of Atlantic Coast Conference women's basketball tournament champions

References

External links
Season roster
Season statistics

Maryland Terrapins women's basketball seasons
NCAA Division I women's basketball tournament championship seasons
NCAA Division I women's basketball tournament Final Four seasons
Maryland Terrapins
2005 in sports in Maryland
2006 in sports in Maryland
2006 NCAA Division I women's basketball tournament participants